On 10 September 2021, a new government headed by Najib Mikati was formed in Lebanon, 13 months after the resignation of former Prime Minister Hassan Diab in August 2020. The cabinet is composed of 24 ministers.

Composition

Resignations 
George Kurdahi, Minister of information, announced his resignation on the third of December 2021, weeks after his criticism on the Yemeni War. As a result, Saudi, Emirati, Kuwaiti and Yemeni diplomats withdrew from Lebanon, and the Lebanese ambassadors in Saudi Arabia, Kuwait and Bahrain were expelled.

Aoun dispute and dissolution 
President Michel Aoun signed the government's resignation decree, a day before his six-year term officially ends, and Prime Minister Najib Mikati's government remains in office in a caretaker capacity which is unconstitutional since it goes against Aoun's request for the cabinet's step-down after numerous attempts failed to form a new cabinet.

References

2021 establishments in Lebanon
Cabinets established in 2021
Cabinets of Lebanon
Mikati